Narath is a census town in Kannur district in the Indian state of Kerala.

Demographics
As of 2011 Census, Narath had a population of 13,092, which constitutes 5,979 (45.7%) males and 7,113 (54.3%) females. The male female sex ratio was 1,190 higher than state average of 1,084. 
In Narath, 12.6% of the population is under 6 years of age. Narath had an overall literacy of 93% higher than national average of 74% and lower than state average of 94%. The male literacy stands at 97.3% and female literacy was 90.5%.

Religion
 India Census, Narath census town had total population of 13,092, among which 53.34% are Hindus, 46.14% are Muslims and 0.52% others.

Transportation
The national highway passes through Valapattanam town.  Goa and Mumbai can be accessed on the northern side and Cochin and Thiruvananthapuram can be accessed on the southern side.  The road to the east of Iritty connects to Mysore and Bangalore.   The nearest railway station is Kannur on Mangalore-Palakkad line. 
Trains are available to almost all parts of India subject to advance booking over the internet.  There are airports at Mattanur, Mangalore and Calicut. All of them are international airports but direct flights are available only to Middle Eastern countries.

References

Cities and towns in Kannur district
Villages near Mayyil